John Blair Deaver (25 July 1855 - 25 September 1931) was an American surgeon, the chief of surgery at the German Hospital in Philadelphia at the turn of the 20th century, who was known to be radical in his surgery. His main area of surgery was the abdomen; he was an advocate of early appendectomy in appendicitis. He was described in his obituary as the "great slasher” and his methods led to the phrase "death by Deaver". He wrote five textbooks and nearly 250 articles.

He was interred at West Laurel Hill Cemetery in Bala Cynwyd, Pennsylvania.

References

External links
 

1855 births
1931 deaths
American surgeons
Burials at West Laurel Hill Cemetery
20th-century surgeons